Peat Island is a small island of approximately eight hectares in the Hawkesbury River, just north of Sydney, New South Wales, Australia. It forms part of the suburb called Mooney Mooney and is located just upstream from the Sydney – Newcastle Freeway bridge. Other islands in the Hawkesbury River include Dangar Island, Spectacle Island, Milson Island, Long Island, and Lion Island.

History

Peat Island was originally known as Rabbit Island, presumably due to the fact that rabbits were being kept there as reported in 1841: "That to the east is termed Goat Island, having many of those animals grazing thereon, the other Rabbit Island, which is numerously stocked as a Rabbit Warren." It was only renamed to Peat Island in 1936, due to its proximity to Peat's Ferry, which at the time was operating between Mooney Mooney and Kangaroo Point on the Hawkesbury. George Peat was an early settler and boat builder who established the first ferry across the Hawkesbury in this vicinity in 1844.

Development of the Island

During the 1890s, the N.S.W. government decided to establish an asylum for inebriates (alcoholics) where they could be treated in isolation from the general prison and hospital population. The relevant legislation was passed in 1900, and Dr J. M. Creed, a member of the N.S.W. Legislative Council from 1885 to 1930, selected Peat, and nearby Milson Island, as the site for the female and male asylums respectively.

Construction began in 1902, with Peat Island being cleared and levelled. Several buildings were erected, including the two storey brick edifices that still dominate the island, and a hexagonal sewing room. Rock and sand for the dam were obtained on site, but cement and other materials had to be hauled  up the cliff face from the river using old Sydney tram cables. The only access to the reservoir was via a series of five, near vertical timber and iron ladders that were pinned into the face of the cliff adjacent to the waterfall. A pipeline ran from the reservoir and serviced both islands via underwater mains.

Some years later, a higher dam was erected a few metres downstream in order to increase capacity, but the original dam wall remains beneath the water, and is sometimes visible during bad droughts. The vertical ladders in the cliff face were still barely trafficable, with missing rungs and rusted anchorages, until their destruction in the January 1994 bushfires. This water supply system was decommissioned when both islands were linked to Sydney mains water.

The expense of establishing the facility in such an isolated location prompted much public criticism, and upon completion in 1905, the Windsor and Richmond Gazette reported drily that: "The Asylum for Inebriates at Rabbit Island, Hawkesbury River, has been completed, at a cost of £6500. A few of our dipsomaniacs in Parliament should be sent thither."

The new facility sat idle for a few years, managed by a caretaker, and hosting various government officials and associates on picnics or social occasions. In January 1905, it was the site of a day trip for an irrigator's conference, and the convivial atmosphere is described in the press report which stated: "... and after a cruise below the famous bridge, the vessel was steered to a small island some three miles above, known as Rabbit Island, where luncheon had been prepared. To back-country men, the title was certainly suggestive, and proved the subject of joking, but the levity became pronounced when inquiry elicited the information that the buildings nearing completion on the island were for an inebriate's home. Sir William Lyne at luncheon caused much laughter by expressing his surprise at the Minister for Works bringing them to such a place to give it baptism, but not with water".

However, by 1907 the government had lost interest in the whole project, deciding instead to set aside space in Darlinghurst gaol for the treatment of inebriates, and the facility was handed over in 1908 to the Lunacy Department for use as a hospital for the insane.

Peat Island Hospital

The first twenty patients were admitted in March 1911, and the facility began to grow and develop, initially as a male only institution. Paths and gardens were laboriously constructed with manual labour, and new buildings were added. Patients and staff spent ten years painstakingly building the rubble causeway and bridge to the mainland that was finally completed in 1957. Over the decades, the hospital outgrew the small island and expanded onto the adjacent mainland, where a chapel and other facilities were constructed, mainly in the 1950s and 1960s.

Despite the scenic location, there is no doubt that the facility would have been a grim place to live, especially in the earlier years. Various press reports document drownings and unexplained deaths of young men and boys, and at least 300 patients who died during their time here were interred in unmarked paupers' graves at the nearby Brooklyn cemetery.

As social attitudes to mental illness and people with developmental disabilities changed over time, the facilities and amenities improved. The school was only opened in 1951 when it was realised that the boys would benefit from schooling. Many of the patients were boys (girls weren't admitted until the 1970s), who were sadly left to their fate in the care of the state, as their parents lacked the willingness or ability to deal with their condition. There are heartbreaking stories from staff who worked there for many years, of children with no parents or family, milling quietly around the lucky ones whose families had turned up to celebrate Christmas and other occasions, desperate to experience the close and unconditional love of someone else's mother or father.

Many patients lived out their entire lives on the island, having been admitted as children, and the island and dedicated staff provided a stable and happy home for the bulk of these people.

The hospital also operated a "canteen" on the Pacific Highway at Mooney Mooney, where fuel and takeaway food was available until 2010.

There were some patients who were allowed the freedom of movement in the adjacent neighbourhood, and whose presence provided the area with some character. Locals would always keep an eye out for these patients to ensure they were safe and well.

Closure

In 1983, the Richmond report on Mental Health Services in N.S.W. recommended that institutions such as Peat Island should be closed and the patients integrated into the general community where possible. Various plans were announced for the facility over the next 27 years until it was finally decommissioned in October 2010, with the last remaining residents moved to new facilities on the Central Coast at Hamlyn Terrace and Wadalba.

In late 2010, local press reported rumours that the island was being considered as a detention centre for asylum seekers, a claim denied by the state and federal governments,  and currently the facility is boarded up and empty, awaiting a decision about its future from the N.S.W. State Property Authority.

References

Islands of New South Wales